Havana Rose is a 1951 American musical comedy film directed by William Beaudine and starring Estelita Rodriguez, Bill Williams and Hugh Herbert. It was one of a number of American films set in Havana during the era.

Plot
The daughter of a Latin-American ambassador in Washington D.C. accidentally wrecks her father's attempts to secure an important loan agreement. She does everything she can to try to put things right.

Cast
 Estelita Rodriguez as Estelita DeMarco 
 Bill Williams as Tex Thompson 
 Hugh Herbert as Filbert Fillmore 
 Florence Bates as Mrs. Fillmore 
 Fortunio Bonanova as Ambassador DeMarco 
 Leon Belasco as Renaldi 
 Nacho Galindo as Carlo 
 Martin Garralaga as Philip 
 Rosa Turich as Maria 
 Tom Kennedy as Hotel Detective 
 Manuel París as Rudolph 
 Robert Easton as Hotel Clerk 
 Felix and His Martiniques 
 Geri Galian and His Rhumba Band  
 Evelynne Smith as Strongest Girl Title Winner
 John Alvin as Reporter  
 Gertrude Astor as Matron  
 Tom Dillon as Policeman  
 Joe Dominguez as Reporter 
 Fred Kelsey as Policeman  
 Eva Novak as Matron  
 Stephen Soldi as Brottle 
 Felipe Turich as Gen. Cucarotsky

References

Bibliography
 Marshall, Wendy L. William Beaudine: From Silents to Television. Scarecrow Press, 2005.
 Pérez Firmat, Gustavo.  Life on the Hyphen: The Cuban-American Way. University of Texas Press, 2012.

External links

1951 films
American musical comedy films
American black-and-white films
1951 musical comedy films
1950s English-language films
Films directed by William Beaudine
Republic Pictures films
Films set in Havana
Films with screenplays by Jack Townley
1950s American films